Ana Isabel Drago Lobato (born 28 August 1975, in Lisbon) is a Portuguese sociologist and politician.

Biography 
She graduated from the University of Coimbra. As a student, she collaborated on several associative activities of the Coimbra Academic Association, where she was journalist of University Journal "A Cabra" and of Coimbra University Radio. Was co-author of the television show "Conversa Privada" with Daniel Sampaio.
She was Member in the Assembly of the Republic of Portugal in IX and X Legislatures, elected by the Left Bloc. In 2012, during Legislature XI, she plays the positions of Deputy, Member of the National Bureau of the Left Bloc and Member of the Political Commission of the Left Bloc.

Published works 
"Agitar Antes de Ousar: O Movimento Estudantil Anti-Propinas", 2003, Edições Afrontamento, Porto

References

External links
Parlamento.pt: Deputados e Grupos Parlamentares "Ana Drago / Partido: BE"
BE Grupo Parlamentar "Ana Drago" 
Ana Drago Agitar Antes de Ousar: O movimento estudantil "antipropinas"
Farpas: entrevistas  Interview with Ana Drago

1975 births
Living people
People from Lisbon
University of Coimbra alumni
Portuguese sociologists
21st-century Portuguese women politicians
21st-century Portuguese politicians
Left Bloc politicians
Women members of the Assembly of the Republic (Portugal)
Members of the Assembly of the Republic (Portugal)